The Pettit National Ice Center is an indoor ice skating facility in Milwaukee, Wisconsin, featuring two international-size ice rinks and a 400-meter speed skating oval. Located adjacent to Wisconsin State Fair Park, the center opened on January 1, 1993, and was named for Milwaukee philanthropists Jane and Lloyd Pettit. Although Wisconsin State Fair Park owns the land and the building, the Pettit National Ice Center Inc., a non-profit corporation, has operated the site since the facility opened.

The Pettit Center replaced, and was constructed, on land once occupied by the Wisconsin Olympic Ice Rink, an outdoor facility that was in operation from 1967 to 1991. The indoor, climate-controlled Pettit Center was a major improvement and continues to attract many skating athletes from around the world. The Wisconsin Speedskating Club, Pinnacle Speedskating Club and DASH speedskating Club all train at the Pettit Center. The Wisconsin Figure Skating Club and Wisconsin Edge synchronized skating team practices on the figure skating rinks, shared with the Milwaukee Jr. Admirals and many other youth ice hockey organizations who use the facility.

The rink
The Pettit is one of only thirty indoor 400-meter ovals in the world, the sixth oldest, and is an official US Speedskating training facility. The Pettit has hosted numerous skating competitions, including the National Short and Long Track Speed Skating Championships, the World Sprint Speed Skating Championships, and the U.S. Olympic Team Trials for Long Track Speed Skating in 2018 and again in 2022.

The rink also hosts a skating school that offers classes for children and adults in figure skating, ice hockey, and speed skating.

Olympic speed skating gold medalists Bonnie Blair and Dan Jansen were the rink's first skaters.

Facility statistics
$13 million facility
Area:
 — total building
 — arena
 of total ice
400-meter oval designed for long track speed skating
Two international-sized rinks for ice hockey, figure skating, and short track speed skating
443-meter, three-lane jogging track surrounding the ice oval
140-person capacity Hall of Fame lounge overlooking the ice arena
Skate rental facilities with figure, hockey and speed skates
Public Skating is available

Track records

Men

Women

Operational Structure
Opened on December 31, 1992, the Pettit National Ice Center combined private and public sources for its construction funding.  A financial restructuring in conjunction with the State of Wisconsin in January 2007 allowed the Pettit Center to be relieved of burdensome lease payments and past-due rent to the State through a negotiated payment of more than $5 million funded by bank-sponsored financing and a $2 million private contribution.  Today, the Pettit National Ice Center, Inc. operates as a private, 501(c)-3 non-profit corporation, that generates 90% of its revenue from operations, including public skating, skating instruction, youth and adult figure skating and hockey programs, running track, and group and corporate meetings, as well as Olympic training.  The balance is received through facility and program sponsorships and charitable contributions.  The Center has a balanced annual operating budget, while continuing to raise sponsorships and charitable contributions for improvements to the Center.

References

External links

Sports venues in Milwaukee
Speed skating venues in the United States
Tourist attractions in Milwaukee County, Wisconsin
Indoor speed skating venues
Indoor ice hockey venues in Wisconsin
Wisconsin State Fair
Sports venues completed in 1993
1993 establishments in Wisconsin